Fraj Dhouibi (born 14 September 1991) is a Tunisian judoka. He is a two-time medalist at the African Games. He also won ten medals at the African Judo Championships, including four gold medals.

Career 

In 2011, he won one of the bronze medals in the men's 60 kg event at the 2011 Pan Arab Games held in Doha, Qatar. At the 2015 African Games held in Brazzaville, Republic of the Congo, he also won one of the bronze medals in the men's 60 kg event.

In 2019, he represented Tunisia at the 2019 African Games held in Rabat, Morocco and he won the silver medal in the men's 60 kg event. In the same year, he also won the gold medal in the men's 60 kg event at the 2019 African Judo Championships held in Cape Town, South Africa. He repeated this with the gold medal in this event at the 2020 African Judo Championships held in Antananarivo, Madagascar.

In 2021, he competed in the men's 60 kg event at the 2021 Judo World Masters held in Doha, Qatar.

Achievements

References

External links 
 

Living people
1991 births
Place of birth missing (living people)
Tunisian male judoka
African Games medalists in judo
African Games silver medalists for Tunisia
African Games bronze medalists for Tunisia
Competitors at the 2015 African Games
Competitors at the 2019 African Games
Mediterranean Games medalists in judo
Competitors at the 2018 Mediterranean Games
Competitors at the 2022 Mediterranean Games
Mediterranean Games silver medalists for Tunisia
21st-century Tunisian people